Jean-René Marsac (born 21 April 1954 in Béganne) was a member of the National Assembly of France.  He represented Ille-et-Vilaine's 4th constituency from 2007 to 2017, as a member of the Socialiste, radical, citoyen et divers gauche.

References

1954 births
Living people
People from Morbihan
Socialist Party (France) politicians
Deputies of the 13th National Assembly of the French Fifth Republic
Deputies of the 14th National Assembly of the French Fifth Republic
Rennes 2 University alumni